Dicks Creek is a stream in Butler and Warren counties, in the U.S. state of Ohio It is a tributary of the Great Miami River.

In the 19th century, the waters of Dicks Creek powered saw mills, grist mills, and a distillery.

Location
Mouth: Middletown, Ohio at 
Source: Franklin, Ohio at

See also
List of rivers of Ohio

References

Rivers of Butler County, Ohio
Rivers of Warren County, Ohio
Rivers of Ohio